The 1990 winners of the Torneo di Viareggio (in English, the Viareggio Tournament, officially the Viareggio Cup World Football Tournament Coppa Carnevale), the annual youth football tournament held in Viareggio, Tuscany, are listed below.

Format
The 24 teams are seeded in 8 groups. Each team from a group meets the others in a single tie. The winner of each group progress to the final knockout stage. The final round matches include 30 minutes extra time and penalties to be played if the draw between teams still holds. The semifinals losing sides play consolation final. The winning teams play the final with extra time and repeat the match if the draw holds.

Participating teams
Italian teams

  Atalanta
  Avellino
  Bari
  Bologna
  Brescia
  Cesena
  Fiorentina
  Inter Milan
  Genoa
  Juventus
  Lazio
  Milan
  Napoli
  Parma
  Roma
  Torino
  Viareggio

European teams

  Crystal Palace
  Dinamo București
  Göteborg
  Slavia Prague
  Red Star Belgrade

American teams
  Newell's Old Boys
Asian teams
  Yomiuri

Group stage

Group A

Group B

Group C

Group D

Group E

Group F

Group G

Group H

Knockout stage

Champions

Footnotes

External links
 Official Site (Italian)
 Results on RSSSF.com

1990
1989–90 in Italian football
1989–90 in English football
1989–90 in Yugoslav football
1989–90 in Czechoslovak football
1989–90 in Argentine football
1989–90 in Romanian football
1989–90 in Mexican football
1990 in Swedish football
1990 in Japanese football